Allied Academies (also known as Allied Business Academies) is a reportedly fraudulent corporation chartered under the laws of North Carolina. Its postal address is in London, United Kingdom. It presents itself as an association of scholars, with supporting and encouraging research and the sharing and exchange of knowledge as its stated aims. The organization consists of 30 affiliate academies, which provide awards to academics and publish academic journals both online and in hard copy for members. Since 2015 the organization has been listed on Jeffrey Beall's list of "potential, possible, or probable predatory scholarly open-access publishers". It is in a partnership with OMICS Publishing Group which uses its website and logo. In 2018, OMICS owner Srinubabu Gedela declared that he had informed the Nevada court that Allied Academies was a subsidiary of OMICS International. During a conference in 2018, they falsely listed a prominent chemist among its organizing committee who had not agreed to this and was not affiliated with Allied Academies.

List of journals

Published under Allied Academies

Published under Allied Business Academies

References

External links
 
 Allied Business Academies

Academic publishing
1995 establishments in North Carolina